Gaspar Henaine (6 January 1927 – 30 September 2011), more commonly known by his pseudonym Capulina, was a Mexican comedian, actor, singer, film producer, and screenwriter. He is best known for partnering with Marco Antonio Campos as the double act Viruta and Capulina and for his subsequent solo career. He was later given the  nickname "El Rey del Humorismo Blanco" (The King of White Humor), due to his clean, innocent style of comedy.

Early life
Capulina was born in Chignahuapan, Puebla, the son of Antonio Henaine Helú, a Lebanese businessman, and Concepción Pérez de León (c. 1893 – 27 February 1983), who was also born in Chignahuapan. He and his family later moved to Mexico City. At age 10, he made his acting debut with a small part in Fernando de Fuentes' Allá en el rancho grande (1936). He studied acting and later won the "best dramatic child actor" award bestowed by the academy he attended. He started his musical career as one of the vocalists of the quartet Los Excéntricos del Ritmo. Later, in 1946, he formed part of the trio Los Trincas. The trio was hugely successful and toured Mexico and some cities of the United States.

Career

Viruta and Capulina

Capulina became famous across Latin America alongside his longtime professional partner, Marco Antonio Campos, as Viruta and Capulina. In 1951, they started filming together. The two comedians made 26 films. At first they imitated the comedy style of Laurel and Hardy, thanks to their physical resemblance to them. With time they developed their own characteristic comedy style. The main difference with Laurel and Hardy is that Viruta, the thin character, was also the intelligent and aggressive one, while Capulina, the portly character, was the fool and cowardly one.

In the peak of their popularity they had a television program called Cómicos y canciones, where they alternated with other comedians and singers. Some of their sketches were written by a then unknown Roberto Gomez Bolaños who later gained legendary fame as comedian Chespirito.

Many rumors surfaced when the two co-workers stopped making films together; some suggested that Viruta felt underpaid, but Capulina attributed the separation to a feud between the two caused by lack of film jobs towards the end of their working relationship. Although he admitted that both he and Viruta felt some animosity against each other during their last six films together, Capulina also felt deep sorrow when Viruta died. A sufferer of three previous heart attacks, Viruta died after his fourth heart attack.

Later career
Capulina made a total of 84 movies, 58 of them after separating from Viruta. He also has recorded 12 music albums. One of his most famous films was Santo contra Capulina (1969), where he co-starred with Mexican wrestling legend El Santo.

Most of the films where he starred shared the same theme, to generate an adventure based on Capulina getting in trouble due to a specific issue, added with his position as an incompetent and foolish person. For example, in El mundo de los aviones (1969), Capulina is a pilot that always fails to land his plane correctly, hitting some wall and encrusting a partner in the process. He is involved in an international fraud and he teams with his airline partners to prevent the robbery, not without several funny problems.

He went from being the same character in different situations and who confronts different kind of enemies like robbers, gangs, spies, and also vampires, monsters, and mummies, with the aid of adventurers, wrestlers (like El Santo) or unexpected powers.

The character of Capulina gained huge popularity and a very successful comic book series -with stories by comic artist Oscar González Guerrero and art by his son Oscar Gonzalez Loyo- was published in the seventies and early eighties.

Capulina's last film was Mi compadre Capulina (1989). He also made a television series, Las aventuras de Capulina (1989), where he struggled in different adventures with the help of wrestler Tinieblas and sidekick Alushe.

His telenovela debut in El diario de Daniela (1996) was also his last appearance.

Capulina was also a theatrical actor and stand-up comedian. He toured with his act until 1997, when he retired, claiming that he was feeling too old to go on.

Death
Henaine died of complications with pneumonia and a gastric ulcer on September 30, 2011.

Selected filmography

References

External links

1927 births
2011 deaths
Mexican male comedians
Mexican male film actors
Mexican male stage actors
Mexican male television actors
Mexican male singers
Male actors from Puebla
Singers from Puebla
Mexican people of Lebanese descent
20th-century Mexican male actors